Lifeguard was the name of a 1956 safety package marketed by the Ford Motor Company.

Spurred by Robert McNamara, the Cornell University crash research program and the first year of Ford's own crash testing (1955) the Lifeguard package included:

Three standard features:
 A safety "deep-center" steering wheel with spokes that would flex.
 Safety "double-grip" door latches to prevent occupant ejection in case of a crash.
 Safety rearview mirror to reduce broken glass if shattered.
Two optional features:
 Front and rear  lap only seat belts (first offered by Ford in 1955).
 Padded dashboard and sun visors (the padding was advertised as being more absorbent than foam rubber.) The instruments were recessed to minimize injury potential.

According to some, the buying public was unresponsive to the Lifeguard package, prompting Henry Ford II to say: McNamara is selling safety, but Chevrolet is selling cars. though Ralph Nader and Joan Claybrook dispute this claiming that the package was extremely popular.

1957 update 

In 1957, Ford updated the Lifeguard safety package with a new frame that bowed out to completely enclose the passengers, rear child-proof door locks, a front hinged hood to protect against the hood flying up in the wind, and recessed knobs.

Notes

Sources 
 1956 Crown Victoria
 The Outsider. How Robert McNamara changed the automobile industry
Lifeguard Design, original publicity shots

Automotive safety
Ford Motor Company